Brooke Dyan Candy (born July 20, 1989) is an American rapper, singer, songwriter, director, and tattoo artist. Raised in the suburbs of Los Angeles, daughter of Tom Candy, former CFO of Hustler magazine, Brooke rose to prominence after starring in Grimes' music video for "Genesis" (2012). Following its success, Candy's status in the underground scene rose as she began to release her own material: "Das Me" (2012), "Everybody Does" (2013), and "I Wanna Fuck Right Now" (2013). In 2014, she signed with RCA and released her debut major label single, "Opulence", with an accompanying EP of the same name on May 6, 2014. Later, she joined Columbia's UK roster. Both are divisions of Sony Music.

Candy's debut album, Daddy Issues, was originally intended for a 2015 release but saw a series of delays. Following a slew of pop-driven singles, including the moderately-successful "Living Out Loud" (2017), Candy left the labels in 2017. Throughout 2017 and 2018, she toured alongside Charli XCX and Lizzo, also headlining her own tour, the Tie Me Up Tour (2018), in Asia. Candy released her first full-length album, Sexorcism, in 2019.

Early life
Brooke Candy was born in Oxnard, California, grew up in the Los Angeles suburb of Agoura Hills and is of Italian and Jewish descent. Her parents divorced when she was eight. Her mother was a pediatric nurse.

Career

2011–2013: Underground beginnings
Candy lived out of her car for a period, working as a stripper at the Seventh Veil adult club in Hollywood. While working as an intern for Rachel Zoe, Candy contacted Larry Flynt, seeking work as a photographer for Hustler. Flynt eventually employed her as a mannequin stylist for Hustler store fronts. Candy described the job as "dress[ing] the mannequins slutty."
During this time, Candy was approached by a producer at a party, who was drawn to her outlandish fashion style and invited her to the studio to create a song together. Candy and close friend Jesse Saint John worked with the producer, Khris Lorenz, on Candy's debut single "Das Me", which eventually received an official release on October 16, 2012.

In August 2012, Candy co-starred in the music video for Grimes' single "Genesis". During 2012 and 2013, Candy independently released her first three music videos for her songs; "Das Me", "Everybody Does", and "I Wanna Fuck Right Now" on YouTube. The videos had amassed more than a million views each by early 2013. Candy's first major label recording took place when she appeared on the track "Cloud Aura" on Charli XCX's debut album True Romance. Candy was introduced to Charli by Azealia Banks when Candy hosted Banks' Mermaid Ball in Los Angeles. Candy recorded several club-rap songs during her early years in the music industry, eight of which accumulated on her debut mixtape The Mixtape, released on June 25, 2013 by Brooke Candy herself.

2014–2017: Breakthrough, Opulence, and major-label releases
In late 2013, Candy caught singer and songwriter Sia's attention, and was contacted via Instagram with the purpose of writing one song for her. Sia eventually ended up executive producing Candy's debut EP, helping her to get a record contract and to find, in Sia's words: "[a] decent, nice, honest management, and [to] help [her] make the art [she] want to make from a place of positive mental health and love". 
Candy eventually signed with RCA Records in February 2014. "Opulence", co-written with Sia and produced by Diplo, was her first single with the label. The first single was performed on April 3, 2014, at Nicola Formichetti's debut Diesel fashion show on Venice. It was later released on April 22, 2014, as digital download along the premiere of its official music video directed by Steven Klein and styled by Formichetti. The video explores the theme of "freaks," a concept that was conceived by Candy and Formichetti at a drag bar in Tokyo. It features transgender women, drag queens, and gay men who are friends with Candy. "We're all freaks and outcasts, and this was meant to empower them," Candy said. Formichetti, Candy and Klein worked on a V Magazine shoot that led to Steven Klein directing "Opulence".

Candy's debut EP Opulence featuring the title track as the lead single, was released on May 6, 2014. The EP was generally praised by critics. Kevin Apaza from Direct Lyrics described it as "five songs featuring hard-hitting synths, fierce and risqué lyrics, and a swagger by Brooke that can’t be duplicated. She’s making us excited about female rappers again. There just have to be more options than Nicki or Iggy!". Ashley Emma NG from Best Fan also praised the project saying "Opulence brings a fresh sound that is all Brook[e] Candy. Some may not understand her lascivious and unconventional attitude, but you can’t help but respect her hustle. Her confidence is indestructible, and not once does it come off as cocky."

On May 16, 2015, Brooke Candy uploaded on Vevo a video called "A Study in Duality", where she "explores the various archetypes of today's culture". It featured the instrumental of her song "Happy Days", which was produced by More Mega and released later in the year. The video itself was directed by Candy and Lil Internet, under Formichetti's fashion direction and Hayley Pisaturo's styling.

Candy's debut album was set to be called Daddy Issues, being executively produced by then label-mate Sia, who was also a songwriter on the record. Sia stated that "[she] was the only person who could really support [Candy] in becoming who [she is] on a grander stage or platform". At that time, Sia had written at least two songs for the album, one being the then-upcoming single "Living Out Loud" which features Sia herself, and another Cher-inspired record. Other collaborators included Greg Kurstin, Jack Antonoff and Matthew Koma.

In August 2015, Brooke Candy partnered with MAC Cosmetics on a line of makeup products. A song called "Rubber Band Stacks" was released as a single. The music video, directed by Cody Critcheloe and styled by Formichetti was premiered on August 17. It was released on August 13, 2015, followed by its music video on August 18. The song is featured on the Madden NFL 16 video game.

Candy announced the release of her single "Happy Days" on January 25, 2016, by releasing footage of its music video through her Instagram account.
On January 29, 2016, Brooke Candy released the new single. The song noticeably marked a shift from Candy's previous material, as she began to develop a more pop-friendly sound described as "gloomy electro-pop". Candy stated about her new musical direction: "In recent past I’ve found myself undergoing endless transformations through emotional states of being and it is reflected through changing vocal styles and aesthetic approaches… I am exploring sounds that are bit more polished and digestible." She also talked about the lyrics's meaning on an interview with i-D saying: "This song addresses the struggle I've had looking for "happy days" in every possible easy way, only to find out that you can't short cut the constantly on-going process of finding your version of happiness." "Happy Days" received mainly a positive response from music critics. Megan Williams form IDOL Magazine praised the song's "sincere lyrics and catchy hook". She also remarked how Candy managed to keep her natural attitude despite the musical shift compared to her early material. Mike Wass from Idolator gave a positive review, noting its accessibility compared to Candy's past material as well as its relatable chorus. Popjustice staff considered that the song was set to make Candy "an unexpected 2016-slaying pop superstar". On February 4, 2016, its video, also styled by Formichetti and directed by Renata Raksha, premiered on Nylon, and later was uploaded on YouTube. On May 13 she released a song titled "Changes" to promote her second makeup line with MAC. On June 2 a new track called "Nasty" along its music video, directed by Rankin and co-styled by Candy herself was premiered via Hunger TV. On July 7, another single called "Paper or Plastic" was released The song received mixed reviews, with many commenting on how the song was unlike her previous material, as Candy does not rap during the song and instead sings the verses. Mike Wass of Idolator felt that Candy was making a conscious move away from "the twisted white-girl rap" present in her past songs "Opulence" and "I Wanna Fuck Right Now". Wass also called the track "unusually restrained" for the artist. When responding to criticism regarding her change in musical style, Candy stated: "[W]hatever I have to do [to] garner a larger, broader audience to spread my message on a larger scale, I stand for women, I stand for freedom. For love and self-preservation." The music video for the song, directed by Darren Craig, premiered a week later.

Candy released on December 16, 2016, a KDA remix of the previously unreleased song "Living Out Loud", which featured Sia. The original and proper single version of the song was released on February 3, 2017. 
About the creative process and the song's creation, Candy stated: "Sia took the reins writing it over two and a half years ago, and I recorded it then. We’ve mixed and remixed it, and we waited for the right moment [to release it]. I like the sonic composition of it, and it’s interesting having me and Sia sing back and forth to each other. At the time I was getting sober, thinking about changing my lifestyle, finding happiness… So it resonated with me because I was looking for that." The same day the song was released RCA stated that the album was set for a spring 2017 release.

2017–2020: Independent career and Sexorcism

In 2017, the release for Daddy Issues was canceled after Candy left RCA. In January of the same year, Candy starred in the fashion film directed by Gracie Otto and Thomas Kerr called Candy Crush. During June 2017, she toured as a supporting act for Lizzo and performed at LA Pride. The same month, Candy spoke freely to Bullett magazine about her experience with RCA Records, stating: "I feel like I’ve been in a weird Matrix glitch for the past three or four years, but I’m finally out of it—back at square one, but way healthier." Also saying: "I never particularly wanted to make mainstream pop music—it just seemed like a great opportunity and a really cool way for me to build a fucking massive platform to spread a conscious, positive message to young girls and the queer community. But I think I have a better chance of doing that if I just stay true to what I’m good at—making raw and authentic rap music, and just being myself." 
Candy also confirmed that she was working on an EP set to be released during summer of 2017. In another interview with Noisey, she stated that Sony owned the songs so after her departure, the album was ultimately cancelled and the EP would be all new original songs. She premiered the music video for her single "Volcano" on July 7, 2017. The song was co-written by Candy herself, producer Cory Enemy, Sia, and Jesse Saint John.

Candy released "For Free" as a Germany-only promotional single on March 14, 2018. It was featured on the Germany's Next Topmodel "Hip-Hop Edition" episode, where Candy made an appearance and a music video filming took place. Then, a single called "War", written by Candy with Jesse Saint John, MNDR, Peter Wade, Will Ivy and Dave Sharma came out on May 18, 2018, along its lyric video, directed by Korean artist MLMA. "War" was released as the lead single for Candy's punk rock-inspired second EP titled Who Cares?, which was eventually scrapped as Candy moved on to new material. The follow-up single "My Sex" featuring Pussy Riot, MNDR and Mykki Blanco was released on August 17, 2018, along its animated music video, directed by Swedish artist Pastelae and made in collaboration with ManyVids. The song was co-written by Charli XCX and also produced by MNDR and Wade, with additional production by Trapchat. She also teamed up with Pornhub directing an erotic film called I Love You, which was released on August 29, 2018.

On November 7, 2018, Candy stated that releasing a first full-length album was still a possibility. "Because of my experience with Sony, I must have made like 60 songs and they just never let me put any of them out. I had a full album ready to go and that kind of burnt me a little bit and put a bad taste in my mouth. I questioned my music and my art for a while and just stopped making it completely," Candy explained. "I'll release the next couple of songs but I'm planning an album and it's in the works. I don't want to jump ahead and say things because if things don't happen like, godammit!" On November 16, a new single called "Nuts" featuring American songwriter and rapper Lil Aaron was released. The song was written along frequent collaborator Jesse Saint John and Sarah Hudson. On December 12, 2018, she released a joint single along production duo Ojivolta called "Oomph". The music video, directed by Candy herself, debuted the same day. On December 25, 2018; she released a collection of unreleased tracks for free download. It included a demo of Candy's 2017 single "Volcano" as well as collaborations with SOPHIE, Lakewet, and Cory Enemy among others. Following a promotional tour in Asia, a Takahiro Nishikawa-directed tour documentary, Tokyo Tour Diary, was premiered via Noisey on January 4, 2019.

On January 10, 2019, Candy confirmed that she just had finished her debut album. She recorded it in London with English producer, singer and songwriter Oscar Scheller along with London-based American rapper Ashnikko. Candy spoke on her time alongside the pair: "Ashnikko is basically a savant! We agreed she would help with an EP if I helped with a music video, but we had three tracks done in a day… within four days we had twelve strong, cohesive songs!" On February 28, Candy confirmed that the album was titled Sexorcism and that the first promotional single was called "Happy", which was released on March 29, 2019 along its official music video directed by Rankin. The track lyrically deals with themes such as mental health and identity and has been described as "some of [Candy's] most personal work to date". Paper Magazine stated that Candy "takes you through the motions of battling mental health and finding that there's pleasure in the pain."
Sexorcism was stated for a tentative September 2019 release via Sega Bodega's imprint NUXXE. The second single "XXXTC" featuring Charli XCX and Maliibu Miitch was released on July 2, 2019 while its music video directed by Luke Abby and Dejan Jovanović premiered on July 23. Preceded by the singles "Drip" featuring Erika Jayne and "FMU" featuring Rico Nasty, Sexorcism was released on October 25, 2019. Candy  embarked on the Sexorcism Tour to promote the album. Music videos for "Freak Like Me", "Nymph", "Honey Pussy", and "Cum" were also released.

2021–present: Tattooing and Freaky Princess
In November 2021, Candy stated in an interview with Inked that she started tattooing during the pandemic and had since become a tattoo artist. Candy also revealed that she had been working on her second studio album in London, which she described as "more pop and digestible". In May 2022, she announced the production of her second studio album, set to be released by NUXXE and initially slated for release that summer. With the working title Freaky Princess, the album's lead single "Flip Phone" was released September 9, 2022 along a self-directed music video produced by the magazine Paper along Korean sunglasses brand Gentle Monster. On October 14, 2022, Candy collaborated with Croatian musician Only Fire on the single "Yoga", presumed to be the second single of Freaky Princess. In an interview with Only Fire in January 2023, Candy discussed the possibility of reworking Freaky Princess into an EP, stating that she already had enough finished material for one.

On February 1, 2023, Brooke announced the third single of Freaky Princess, "Juicy Fruit", which would be released later in the month on Valentine's Day and features backing vocals from Cecile Believe. "Juicy Fruit" had previously been teased several times on Candy's personal TikTok and Instagram accounts. The official '80s-inspired music video directed by Jennifer Juniper Stratford premiered later that day through People Magazine.

Artistry
Candy's music has been described as electropop and pop-rap, while her more club-rap work has been recognized for its twerk-able nature, springy beats, and cyberpunk. Thematically, Candy's music has been described as an intersection between art, sex, and fantasy, as well as sexual liberation and empowerment.

Candy is known for her extreme and versatile fashion style. Sia described Candy as a "feminista glam alien". Vogue profiled Candy in July, 2014, saying "For all her shape-shifting, perhaps it's helpful to think of Brooke Candy as a tabula rasa whose videos, concerts, and everyday appearances each necessitate a different character. Together, they make her a fashion plate palimpsest."

Candy's fashion has been described as a distinctive stripper-meets-Tumblr aesthetic. She often collaborates with fashion designer Seth Pratt. Following trends in stan culture, Candy has nicknamed her fanbase #FagMob.

Vice blogger Ali Carman asked Candy, in an interview, if she was offended that her internet persona was considered fake. Candy replied: "My persona is a reality to me, you know. Like I would never rap and act hood if it wasn't actually my mentality and I wouldn't perform in a super-sexual way if being a stripper wasn't the way I made money." MTV called Candy's look "super hardcore", a "breath of fresh, fearless air", and a prayer answered by the pop goddesses. Calling her the "Freaky Princess", The Guardian journalist Michael Cragg agreed with the stripper-turned-rapper's alias, comparing her to Xena, the Warrior Princess.

Candy also hosts a blog dedicated to photography.

Personal life
Candy is openly pansexual, and has cited Lil' Kim as an inspiration for her rapping technique and irreverent image. She also expresses strong feminist ideals. Candy has been open about her struggles with bipolar disorder and her methods of managing it through artistic self-expression and tattoos. She has several tattoos, including the name "Gotti" tattooed on the inside of her forearm in honor of John Gotti, after whom she has also named her puppy. She is an adamant and vocal proponent of the legalization of sex work and legality of recreational use of marijuana. Her image is highly sexualized. "They told me not to make something so sexual", she told New York writer Christopher Glazek, recalling a conversation she had with her record executives about the music video for her song "I Wanna Fuck Right Now".

Candy married fellow tattoo artist Kyle England in 2019. She has spoken about going sober since the release of Sexorcism and how clarity has affected her life and creative control over her art.

Awards and nominations
{| class=wikitable
|-
! Year !! Awards !! Work !! Category !! Result
|-
| 2014
| UK Music Video Awards
| "Opulence"
| Best Styling 
| 
|-
| 2019
| Berlin Music Video Awards
| "My Sex"
| Best Animation
|

Discography

 Sexorcism (2019)
 Freaky Princess (TBA)

Tours
Headlining
 Tie Me Up Tour (2018)
 The Whore Tour (2019)
 Sexorcism Tour (2019)

Supporting
 Charli XCX - Number 1 Angel Tour (2017)
 Lizzo - Good as Hell Tour (2017)
 Cupcakke - The Ephorize Tour (2018)
 Charli XCX - Charli Live Tour (2019)

Promotional
 Opulence US Promotional Tour (2014)
 Asia Tour '18 (2018)

Guest
 Azealia Banks - Mermaid Ball (2011)

Filmography

Music videos

References

External links

1989 births
Living people
American electronic musicians
American female erotic dancers
American erotic dancers
American women rappers
American women singer-songwriters
American women pop singers
Feminist rappers
Feminist musicians
American hip hop singers
American people of Italian descent
American people of Jewish descent
Bisexual singers
Bisexual songwriters
Electropop musicians
LGBT people from California
LGBT rappers
American LGBT singers
American LGBT songwriters
Musicians from Oxnard, California
Pansexual musicians
People from Tarzana, Los Angeles
Pop rappers
Rappers from Los Angeles
Sex-positive feminists
American women in electronic music
21st-century American women singers
21st-century American rappers
American women hip hop singers
21st-century American singers
20th-century American LGBT people
21st-century American LGBT people
Singer-songwriters from California
21st-century women rappers
American bisexual writers